Arucha Tosawat (also spelled Tohssawat; born Rattanaballang Tosawat 22 September 1979) is a Thai film and television actor and model.

He graduated from Bangkok University with a Bachelor of Arts degree in Advertising. He is most known for his lead role as Mehk (Cloud in English) in Bangkok Love Story (2007), in Fireball as Tun (2009) and in The Meat Grinder (2009). He has also played a number of TV series and sitcoms on Thai television stations ITV and Channel 7].

Award nominations
In 2008, he was nominated for Best Actor for his role in Bangkok Love Story at the Suphannahong National Film Awards

Filmography
2006: Chai Lai
2007: Bangkok Love Story as Mehk (Cloud)
2009: Fireball as Tun
2009: Meat Grinder
TV series
On itv: Narasingh and Namo Herophunarak
Channel 3: Sanaerakphutsao
Channel 7: Ko Mahatsachan, Yoeifathadin, Nithanthalumiti, Reuansonrak, Seuasangfa, Wiwa...hahae and Pin-anong
On Thai TPBS: Raja Kuning and Ponlaphakrakphaendin

References

External links

Arucha Tosawat
1979 births
Living people
Arucha Tosawat